Facundo Hernán Quiroga (born 10 January 1978) is an Argentine retired professional footballer. Mainly a central defender, he could also play as a right back.

Club career
Born in San Luis, Quiroga began his career at Newell's Old Boys in the Argentine Primera División in 1997. The following year he was signed by Sporting CP, where he spent six years with a season-long loan at Italian side S.S.C. Napoli in 2000–01. He was relatively important in the Lisbon team's 2000 conquest of the Primeira Liga championship, playing alongside another Newell's youth graduate Aldo Duscher who also joined in 1998; at Napoli he played with former Sporting teammate Luis Vidigal, as they were eventually relegated from Serie A.

In 2004, Quiroga moved to VfL Wolfsburg, a club that acquired a number of Argentine players in that timeframe (Oscar Ahumada, Andrés D'Alessandro, Diego Klimowicz and Juan Carlos Menseguez). A regular in the lineups from 2004 to 2007, he only appeared in 12 Bundesliga matches in his last year, subsequently returning to Argentina and joining Club Atlético River Plate.

In 2010, the 32-year-old Quiroga signed for Club Atlético Huracán. He retired three seasons later, with All Boys also in his country's top division.

International career
Quiroga earned 16 caps for the Argentina national team, going on to represent the country at the 2004 Copa América. His debut came on 17 April 2002 in a friendly win in Germany (1–0), playing the entire match and being booked; he was finally overlooked for the squad at that year's FIFA World Cup.

Honours
Sporting
Primeira Liga: 1999–2000, 2001–02
Taça de Portugal: 2001–02

References

External links
Argentine League statistics 

1978 births
Living people
People from San Luis Province
Argentine people of Spanish descent
Argentine footballers
Association football defenders
Argentine Primera División players
Newell's Old Boys footballers
Club Atlético River Plate footballers
Club Atlético Huracán footballers
All Boys footballers
Primeira Liga players
Sporting CP footballers
Serie A players
S.S.C. Napoli players
Bundesliga players
VfL Wolfsburg players
Argentina international footballers
2004 Copa América players
Argentine expatriate footballers
Expatriate footballers in Portugal
Expatriate footballers in Italy
Expatriate footballers in Germany
Argentine expatriate sportspeople in Portugal
Argentine expatriate sportspeople in Italy
Argentine expatriate sportspeople in Germany